J-Fest (Russian: J-FEST, formerly Фестиваль японской поп-культуры "Japanese Pop Culture Festival") is an annual event held in Moscow. The main organizer is the Embassy of Japan in Russia.

Musical artists 
This is a list of musical artists who have performed at the festival:
 2010: AKB48
 2011: Kan, May J., Haruko Momoi
 2012: Yui Makino
 2013: Sumire Uesaka
 2014: Eir Aoi

References

External links 
 

Festivals in Russia
Japanese popular culture
Music festivals established in 2012
Music festivals in Russia
Rock festivals in Russia
J-pop